Ted Stevens (1923–2010) was a U.S. Senator from Alaska from 1968 to 2009.

Senator Stevens may also refer to:

Ben Stevens (born 1959), Alaska State Senate
Dan Stevens (Minnesota politician) (born 1950), Minnesota State Senate
Edward Stevens (general) (1745–1820), Virginia State Senate
Elmer A. Stevens (1862–1932), Massachusetts State Senate
Frederick C. Stevens (New York politician) (1856–1916), New York State Senate
Gary Stevens (politician) (born 1941), Alaska State Senate
Hiram F. Stevens (1852–1904), Minnesota State Senate
James Stevens (New York politician) (1836–1912), New York State Senate
John H. Stevens (1820–1900), Minnesota State Senate
John L. Stevens (1820–1895), Maine State Senate
John Stevens (Tennessee politician) (born 1973), Tennessee State Senate
Moses T. Stevens (1825–1907), Massachusetts State Senate
Orlando Stevens (1797–1879), Vermont State Senate
Richard Y. Stevens, North Carolina State Senate
Robert S. Stevens (judge) (1916–2000), California State Senate
Robert S. Stevens (politician) (1824–1893),  Kansas State Senate
Val Stevens (fl. 1990s–2010s),  Washington State Senate
Willard T. Stevens (1865–1937), Wisconsin State Senate
William A. Stevens (1879–1941), New Jersey State Senate
William N. Stevens (1850–1889), Virginia State Senate

See also
Senator Stephens (disambiguation)